The 13th Pan American Junior Athletics Championships were held in
Windsor, Ontario at the University of Windsor Stadium on July 29–31, 2005.

Participation (unofficial)

Detailed result lists can be found on the Athletics Canada, the CACAC, the USA Track & Field, and the "World Junior Athletics History" website.  An unofficial count yields the number of about 387 athletes from about 35 countries:  Anguilla (1), Antigua and Barbuda (3), Argentina (5), Aruba (1), Bahamas (16), Barbados (6), Bermuda (5), Brazil (29), British Virgin Islands (3), Canada (73), Cayman Islands (4), Chile (6), Colombia (10), Costa Rica (5), Cuba (14), Dominican Republic (2), El Salvador (1), Grenada (2), Guatemala (5), Guyana (1), Haiti (2), Jamaica (43), Mexico (21), Nicaragua (2), Panama (1), Paraguay (2), Peru (6), Puerto Rico (18), Saint Kitts and Nevis (6), Saint Lucia (1), Saint Vincent and the Grenadines (2), Trinidad and Tobago (17), United States (80), Uruguay (1), Venezuela (3).

Medal summary
Medal winners are published.
Complete results can be found on the Athletics Canada, on the CACAC, on the USA Track & Field and on the "World Junior Athletics History"
website.

Men

Women

Medal table (unofficial)

The medal count has been published.   It is in agreement with the following unofficial medal count.

References

External links
World Junior Athletics History

Official results 

Pan American U20 Athletics Championships
Pan American Junior Athletics Championships
Pan American U20 Championships
International track and field competitions hosted by Canada
Pan American Junior Athletics Championships
Pan American Junior Athletics Championships
Pan American Junior Athletics Championships